Paul Mulholland Butler (1905–1961) was an American lawyer who served as the chairman of the Democratic National Committee from 1955 until 1960.

Biography
After being active in Indiana Democratic Party politics, Butler was named to the Democratic National Committee in 1952, when he was a staunch ally of Adlai Stevenson. He later became DNC chairman and used the post to articulate policy positions in opposition to the Eisenhower administration. Butler's liberal ideology was opposed by conservative and moderate Democrats.

References

External links
Eleanor Roosevelt Papers

1905 births
1961 deaths
Democratic National Committee chairs
Indiana Democrats